Milk It: The Best of Death in Vegas is a compilation album by Death in Vegas, released on 7 February 2005 in the UK and on 23 February  2005 in Japan. Disc one is a collection of some of the band's best album tracks, while disc two is a bonus disc of remixes. The album was not released in the US.

Track listing
 "Aisha"
 "So You Say You Lost Your Baby"
 "Dirt"
 "Rekkit"
 "Scorpio Rising"
 "Soul Auctioneer"
 "Hands Around My Throat"
 "All That Glitters"
 "Dirge"
 "Girls"
 "Rematerialised"
 "Broken Little Sister" (Japanese version-only bonus track)

Bonus disc
 "Aisha" (Trevor Jackson mix)
 "Hands Around My Throat" (ADULT. mix)
 "Hands Around My Throat" (UXB mix)
 "Scorpio Rising" (The Polyphonic Spree mix)
 "One More Time"
 "Dirge" (Slam remix)
 "Dirge" (Cossack mix)
 "Dirt" (Mullet mix)
 "Twist And Crawl" (Full mix)
 "Rocco" (Dave Clarke mix)
 "Rekkit" (Two Lone Swordsmen remix) (Effective Machine)
 "Neptune City" (Two Lone Swordsmen remix)

Personnel
 Richard Fearless
 Tim Holmes
 Steve Hellier
 Dot Allison – vocals on "Dirge"
 Bobby Gillespie – vocals on "Soul Auctioneer", "One More Time"
 Iggy Pop – vocals on "Aisha"
 Nicola Kuperus – vocals on "Hands Around My Throat"
 Liam Gallagher – vocals on "Scorpio Rising"
 Paul Weller – vocals on "So You Say You Lost Your Baby"
 Jim Reid - vocals on "Broken Little Sister"

2005 compilation albums
Death in Vegas albums
2005 remix albums
Sony Music remix albums
Sony Music compilation albums